A tipsy cake is a sweet dessert cake, made originally of "fresh sponge cakes soaked in good sherry and good brandy". The dish as prepared in England would typically have several small cakes stacked together, with the cracks between bristling with almonds. As a variety of the English trifle, tipsy cake is  popular in the American South, often served after dinner as a dessert or at Church socials and neighbourhood gatherings. It was a well known dessert by the mid 19th century and was included Mrs Beeton's Book of Household Management in 1861.

The tipsy cake originated in the mid-18th century. A recipe for cake or biscuits, alcohol, and custard combined in a trifle bowl came to the American colonies via the British, who settled in the coastal south. Its popularity remained with Southern planters who enjoyed sweet desserts. Tipsy cake was also humorously called Tipsy Parson, because it presumably lured many a Sunday-visiting preacher "off the wagon". The name refers to the amount of alcohol used in the dish's preparation.

One variety of the cake combines stale pound and/or angel food cake, fruit jam, one ounce whiskey, five ounces sherry, and warm vanilla pie filling or custard. All the ingredients save the pie filling are mixed together; then the warm pie filling/custard is poured over the top and the dish chilled. Whipped cream is poured over the top of the dish just before serving.

See also
 Trifle
 Cuisine of the Southern United States
 Cassata
 List of custard desserts

References

Further reading
 

Cuisine of the Southern United States
Custard desserts
Foods with alcoholic drinks